Calgary Storm Prospects (formerly the Calgary Storm Select) were a Canadian soccer team who played in the Premier Development League, the fourth tier of the American Soccer Pyramid in 2002 and 2003. The team was the official development team of the Calgary Storm of the USL A-League. They played their home games at Glenmore Park Stadium.

History
In 2002, the Calgary Storm moved their PDL team to the USL A-League from the PDL, but created a development team to replace the PDL side. The played in the Northwest Division in the Western Conference.

In 2003, club owner Michael Vandale resigned as owner, citing personal issues and mounting financial losses, handing over the operation of the club to the United Soccer Leagues. The league immediately disbanded the PDL reserve team, with the Abbotsford Rangers, who were operating a provisional league member, taking over the remainder of their fixtures.

Year-by-year

References

Defunct soccer clubs in Canada
Storm
Canadian reserve soccer teams
United Soccer League teams based in Canada
Defunct Premier Development League teams
Association football clubs established in 2002
Association football clubs disestablished in 2003
2002 establishments in Alberta
2003 disestablishments in Alberta